The Nissan Caravan is a light commercial van designed for use as a fleet vehicle or cargo van and manufactured by Nissan since 1973. Between 1976 and 1997, a rebadged version of the Caravan sold as the Nissan Homy, which was introduced as an independent model in 1965. Outside Japan, the Caravan was also sold as either the Nissan Urvan or Nissan King Van, or earlier with Datsun badging.

All generations use a cabover approach due to Japanese Government dimension regulations that annually tax larger vehicles, and the cabover approach maximizes interior space while remaining within defined exterior dimensions.

Prior to 1973, the Caravan's twin, the Homy, had been offered as a standalone generation from 1965 until 1976. The Homy was built and sold by the Prince Motor Company before the merger of Nissan in 1965 and the Homy was the first vehicle to be acquired by Nissan. After the merger in August 1966, because Nissan didn't have a large passenger platform, the Prince Homy was "badge engineered" as the Caravan, and the brand name was changed from Prince to Nissan. The merger was complete by 1970. It shared a chassis with the Prince Homer, a medium-duty cabover pickup truck.

The second generation Homy of 1976, was marketed as a twin to the 1973-era Nissan Caravan, sold at the Nissan Prince Store dealerships, while the Caravan was exclusive to Nissan Bluebird Store locations. The first generation series B640 which was changed to Nissan series T20 was built from 1965 to 1976, the second generation E20 was built from 1976 to 1980, and the third generation E23 was built from 1980 to 1986. The final generation E24 was built from 1986 to 1999, and replaced by the Nissan Elgrand.

Mechanically, the Nissan Caravan and the Nissan Homy were identical. Its traditional competitor from Toyota is the HiAce.

Nissan's largest passenger van is the Nissan Civilian, introduced in 1959, and their smaller platform was the Nissan Vanette.

First generation (B640); (1965-1973) 

The Prince Homy (B640) was the passenger van version of the Prince Homer light duty truck, and had a seating capacity of up to 15 people. In 1966 as the Prince-Nissan merger began, it was initially called the Nissan Homy Prince, sharing load carrying duties with the Prince Skyway, and Prince Gloria station wagons; the Prince name became a dealership network within the Nissan organization in 1970. The Nissan Homy received the T20 model code, and in 1972, the vehicle was reclassified as a commercial vehicle, in order to comply with the 1970 Japanese road traffic law.

Nissan had integrated a previously built product called the Nissan Caball as a cabover truck and cargo van, but had replaced it with the Homy. From 1973, the Homy was also available rebadged as the Nissan Caravan, to fit Nissan's various dealer networks.

Second generation (E20, E21, E22); (1973-1980) 

The E20 series Caravan and Urvan van and minibus were manufactured from February 1973 with seating configurations for three, five, seven, and up to 10 passengers. It was exclusive in Japan to Nissan Bluebird Store, while its twin the Nissan Homy was exclusive to Nissan Prince Store locations. It was especially popular in Europe, and was again very popular with fire departments and as ambulances in certain countries. It had a somewhat difficult handling, as it was heavy to steer, and was not available with power steering. Also, the gear shifter was located at the floor and went all the way up to the height of the hand, and had a slight curve.

It was delivered with a 1.5- and 2.0-liter petrol engines, as well as a 2.2-liter diesel unit. It was produced until replaced by the E23 Caravan in August 1980. In export markets the first and second generations were called Datsun Urvan, until the Nissan brand replaced it worldwide in 1983 and 1984. In 1978, Nissan added the smaller Vanette as the Caravan grew in dimensions and market positioning.

Nissan Homy
The second generation was essentially a cosmetic update with no major mechanical changes. The model code changed to E20.

Third generation (E23; 1980) 

The third generation Nissan Urvan/Caravan, the E23 series, was introduced in August 1980. As before, the Homy, sold through Prince dealerships, was its twin model, set apart by a different grille. The Cabstar and Homer shared much of the bodywork, with the main differences being the frontal treatment and a small side window mounted in the front doors of the Caravan/Homy. Engines were all carryover four-cylinders, ranging from the J16 and H20 pushrod items, via the overhead cam Z20S, and an upgraded SD22 diesel. The van versions were now designed to allow access to the loading area from the passenger compartment. Radial tires were optional. The diesel also benefitted from a new five-speed manual gearbox, while the new luxury GL version offered an optional "Nissanmatic" automatic transmission as well as power steering, comfortable rotating rear seats and air conditioning. In July 1981, a luxurious SGL "Silk Road" version was added.

At the 1981 Tokyo Motor Show, two concept Caravans designed to provide limousine-like accommodation for businessmen were shown, the Royal and Elgrand Royal Line. The Elgrand name was to be adopted for a series of luxurious minivans, beginning in 1997. In May 1982, the Caravan underwent a minor facelift, losing the ventilation window in the front doors, receiving a new dashboard and a new five-bearing SD23 diesel engine replacing the previous SD22. Radial tires became standard for all but the cheapest versions. For more power, coach versions also became available with the turbocharged LD20T diesel. The luxurious "Silk Road" version, with seven captain seats, was only available with the LD20T. This engine passed the 1982 emissions standards for diesel cars. To meet the 1981 emissions standards for petrol cars, coach versions replaced the H20 engine with the new carbureted Z18S and  Z20S.

In April 1983, there was another light facelift, with SGL and GL versions receiving a new look with four square headlights. An LWB DX ten-seater version was also added. In January 1985, six and nine-passenger van versions were added. Diesel versions received improved pre-heating systems and safety equipment was improved. Manual petrol versions were now all five-speed units. An eight-seater "SGL Silk Road Limited" also joined the lineup in May. In September 1986, the E23 was replaced by the fourth generation E24.

Nissan Homy
The Homy and its Caravan twin received their first full model change since the Homy was introduced in 1965. The engine was the 2.0-liter inline-four LD20T turbo diesel. The TD23 inline-four was also available.

FAW Jiefang CA 6440
FAW Jiefang made a clone of the E24 known as the CA 6440. Production started in 1994, having a Chrysler-based CA488 engine with a 5-speed manual transmission. According to the "Regulations on Beijing Road Traffic Management" and the "Regulations on the Implementation of the Law of the People's Republic of China on the Prevention and Control of Air Pollution," such vehicles still in service are not allowed to enter Beijing after May 10, 2001 as part of an effort to combat air pollution.

Fourth generation (E24; 1986) 

The E24 version was built from 1986 until 2001 and underwent two major facelifts, in 1990 and 1995. In some Scandinavian markets, the E24 series was marketed as the "King Van", to tie it in with the popular "King Cab" version of Nissan's D21 pickup truck. Originally, petrol-equipped Caravans had the Z20 engine while commercial diesels had the 2.3-liter, naturally aspirated TD23 and the Coach (passenger version) the LD20T II turbo-diesel. With the October 1990 facelift this was switched to the NA20S. At the same time, an intercooled version (TD27Ti) of the 2.7-liter turbo-diesel replaced the TD27T in most applications. The facelift consisted of a new grille (not on the DX) and new larger tail lights (excluding the DX and GL models).

In August 1995, there was another facelift, mostly consisting of another new grille. The TD27Ti was upgraded to the electronically controlled TD27ETi. The large QD32 four-cylinder diesel was added to automatic-equipped van models in 1996 and produced  from 3153 cc. In May 1997, commercial models were upgraded so as to match the changes already introduced on the Coach models. In June 1999, the passenger models (and Homy nameplate) were discontinued and the engine lineup changed: petrol options were now 2.0 and 2.4-liter Twin cam engines from the KA series, while only the naturally aspirated QD32 diesel remained.

Nissan Homy
The Homy received its second full model change in September 1986 and was given the 2.0-liter Z20 engine, as well as the LD20T turbo-diesel. The model code was now E24. In October 1987, four-wheel drive was added to the 2.7-liter TD27 engine. In March 1988, the premium grade "GT Limousine" was offered with the VG30E alongside the 2.7-liter turbo-diesel. Yearly grade changes continued for the rest of the generation, adding items like cruise control, digital speedometers, larger wheels, upgraded interior and upholstery. August 1995 saw the Homy rebadged and sold as the Isuzu Fargo, using the TD27ETi diesel engine. The Homy Coach was replaced by the Nissan Elgrand in 1997 when the Nissan Prince Store Japanese dealerships were renamed Nissan Red Stage and vehicle overlap was streamlined. The Homy badge, first used in 1965, remained in use for commercial models until it, too, was cancelled in June 1999 as the Homy/Caravan lineups were merged.

Fifth generation (E25; 2001) 

Nissan produced the E25 series from April 2001 to 2012. It was also sold as the Isuzu Como on the Japanese market, replacing the last generation Isuzu Fargo which was a rebadged version of the E24 Caravan. The New Zealand Urvan received a one-star rating on the ANCAP crash test.

Mexico was the only North American country to receive the Nissan Caravan vans. 2010 was the last year for this generation in Mexico, as the US-built Nissan NV replaces it.

Sixth generation (E26; 2012) 

At the 2011 Tokyo Motor Show, a replacement of the Nissan Caravan, called the NV350 Caravan, was premiered. It went on sale on 15 June 2012 with diesel engine and super long body variants went on sale on 13 July 2012, and the wide version model arrived in winter 2012. The new NV350 Caravan comes with the all new YD25DDTi engine with clean diesel technology. Most petrol engines take advantage of its fuel saving technology for class leading fuel economy, for example the QR20DE. Those engines achieved either a 10 or 5 percent improvement in fuel economy over Japan's 2015 fuel economy standard. The NV350 Caravan continues to be sold as the Isuzu Como on the Japanese market as well. The NV350 Caravan received its first facelift on 13 July 2017 and its second facelift on 20 October 2021, when it was renamed back to Nissan Caravan.

In the Philippines, the NV350 Caravan (E26) was introduced on 11 June 2015 and is known as the NV350 Urvan. The NV350 Urvan is imported from Japan rather than being assembled locally. It is offered in five models: the base-grade 3-seater Hi-roof Cargo, the base-line 18-seater VX, the top base-line 15-seater Shuttle, the mid-range 12-seater Escapade and the high-end 10-seater Super Elite. In May 2017, the base-top-of-the-line NV350 Urvan Premium was launched. It is a 15-seater model, available with 5-speed manual and 5-speed automatic transmissions, being the first ever Urvan in the Philippines that comes with a standard automatic transmission. In March 2018, the high-top-of-the-line 8-seater Urvan Premium S was launched, it is also offered with either a 5-speed manual or an automatic transmission.

On 11 September 2013, Mitsubishi Fuso Truck and Bus Corporation and Nissan Motor Co., Ltd reached a basic agreement regarding original equipment manufacturer supply of finished commercial vans for export, whereby Nissan would supply NV350 Urvans to be sold as the Fuso Canter Van. Two versions are offered, the van and microbus.

This generation (E26) is sold in Mexico as the NV350 Urvan.

2022 facelift 
The second facelift Caravan was launched for the Japanese market on 20 October 2021. It features the new flat-bottom steering wheel, while the layout of the dashboard remains the same. High-trim variants also get automatic climate control, a touchscreen infotainment system, and copper accents on the air-conditioning vents. The second facelift Caravan also comes with the latest version of the Nissan Intelligent Mobility safety suite of technology. As a result, lane departure warning, intelligent emergency brake, and intelligent around-view monitor are just some of the features that come standard on the second facelift Caravan.

In the Philippines, the facelifted Caravan was introduced on 24 October 2022 as the Urvan. It is offered in five grades: the entry-level 3-seater Cargo (Hi-roof), the mid-grade 18-seater and 15-seater Standard (Normal roof) and the top-spec 15-seater Premium (Hi-roof), the high-end 3-seater GX (Hi-roof) is also available for Customization and Special Purpose configurations. Escapade, Super Elite and Premium S grades were removed from the lineup. For the Philippine market, the Urvan retains the YD25DDTi diesel engine mated to a 5-speed manual transmission for all models and 5-speed automatic transmission which is only available for the GX and Premium grades.

Gallery

References

External links 

 Official Nissan NV350 website (Japanese)
 Official Mitsubishi Fuso Canter Microbus/Van brochure

Caravan
Cab over vehicles
Rear-wheel-drive vehicles
Vans
Minibuses
ANCAP business and family vans
Vehicles introduced in 1965